The Indian Language School was established in Lagos, Nigeria in 1982 in light of the growing Indian community in the city. Indian Language School is a private school setup by the Indian high commission in Nigeria.

It was originally set up in a residential neighborhood at 11 Johnson Street, Illupeju. The school began as converted residences — with three floors, a playground, a football court, a basketball court, and a volleyball court. Over the past few years, the school has expanded significantly, acquiring nearby properties, thus catering to the large number of students that enroll with the school each year. This is currently the only Indian school in Lagos and offers education till 12th standard. It has classes from LKG to XII and has been holding CBSE Board Examinations for Grades X and XII, since the late 1980s.

Organization
Approximately 3,000 students are registered. The school follows the Central Board of Secondary Education curriculum and helps Indian students residing in Lagos to transition into higher education programs. The current principal of the school is Sonali Rajan-Gupta. The former principal, Ms Suman Kanwar was principal from 1985 to 2013.

Alumni

Vir Das, Indian actor and stand-up comedian

See also 
 India–Nigeria relations

References

External links

 Indian Language School
 Central Board of Secondary Education, India
 Text books prescribed by National Council of Education and Research, India

Educational institutions established in 1982
International schools in Lagos
Indian international schools
1982 establishments in Nigeria
Asian-Nigerian culture
India–Nigeria relations